This was the first edition of the event.

Libor Pimek and Blaine Willenborg won in the final 5–7, 6–4, 6–2, against Carlos di Laura and Claudio Panatta.

Seeds

Draw

Draw

References
Draw

ATP Athens Open
1986 Grand Prix (tennis)